Longworth House is an historic country house at Longworth in the English county of Oxfordshire (formerly in Berkshire). It is a Grade II listed building.

It was owned by the Marten family during the 16th and 17th centuries. Former residents include Sir Henry Marten, Judge of the Admiralty Court.

References

Country houses in Oxfordshire
Grade II listed buildings in Oxfordshire